Nights In The Dark is the second studio album by American band California X. It was released in January 2015 under Don Giovanni Records.

Critical reception

Ian Gormely of Exclaim! noted an improvement in writing hooks and guitar playing, writing that the band is "comfortable in their own skin and playing at the peak of their powers, but the album would have fared best as a pared down EP nonetheless."

Track list

References

2015 albums
California X albums
Don Giovanni Records albums